Martin Katz (born November 27, 1944) is an American pianist, educator and conductor, primarily known for his work as an accompanist.

Over his 30 years as a performer, Mr. Katz has accompanied such stars as Marilyn Horne, Cecilia Bartoli, Kathleen Battle, Kiri Te Kanawa, Sylvia McNair, Frederica von Stade, Karita Mattila, David Daniels, José Carreras, Samuel Ramey, and Piotr Beczała.

Editions of Baroque and bel canto operas prepared by Katz have been performed at the Metropolitan Opera, the Houston Grand Opera, and Opera Lyra Ottawa.

Musical America's "Accompanist of the Year" in 1998, Katz currently teaches collaborative piano at the University of Michigan School of Music, Theatre & Dance. He is the author of the book, The Complete Collaborator: The Pianist as Partner. 

From 1966 to 1969, Mr. Katz was in the U.S. Army and was assigned to The United States Army Band (Pershing's Own) in Washington, DC.  He served as piano soloist and accompanist with the United States Army Chorus.

He is a member of Phi Mu Alpha Sinfonia, a professional music fraternity that he joined while working towards his undergraduate degree at The University of Southern California, where he studied the field of accompanying with its pioneering teacher, 
Gwendolyn Koldofsky. Katz is an alumnus of the Music Academy of the West.

Discography
 Frederica von Stade: Song Recital, Columbia, 1978
 Frederica von Stade: Shéhérazade, Columbia, 1981
 Frederica von Stade Live!, Columbia, 1982
 Marilyn Horne: Divas in Song, RCA Victor Red Seal, 1994
 Frederica von Stade: Voyage à Paris , RCA Victor Red Seal, 1995

References

1945 births
American classical pianists
Male classical pianists
American male pianists
Living people
Classical accompanists
University of Michigan faculty
USC Thornton School of Music alumni
20th-century American pianists
21st-century classical pianists
20th-century American male musicians
21st-century American male musicians
21st-century American pianists
Music Academy of the West alumni